Jaydon Banel (born 19 October 2004) is a Dutch professional footballer who plays for Jong Ajax.

Club career 
Becoming a regular with the Ajax youth team during the 2021–22 season—most notably in the UEFA Youth League—, Banel made his professional debut for Jong Ajax on the 17 January 2022, replacing Naci Ünüvar during a home Eerste Divisie game against Den Bosch, helping his team to a 2–1 win by delivering an assist for Ar'jany Martha's goal.

Personal life
Born in the Netherlands, Banel is of Surinamese descent.

International career
In September 2022 Banel played for the Dutch U19 team against Slovenia.

References

External links

2004 births
Living people
Dutch footballers
Dutch sportspeople of Surinamese descent
Association football forwards
Jong Ajax players
Eerste Divisie players